Gordon Meredith Lightfoot Jr.  (born November 17, 1938) is a Canadian singer-songwriter and guitarist who achieved international success in folk, folk-rock, and country music. He is credited with helping to define the folk-pop sound of the 1960s and 1970s. He has been referred to as Canada's greatest songwriter and is known internationally as a folk-rock legend. Lightfoot's biographer Nicholas Jennings said, "His name is synonymous with timeless songs about trains and shipwrecks, rivers and highways, lovers and loneliness."

Lightfoot's songs, including "For Lovin' Me", "Early Morning Rain", "Steel Rail Blues", "Ribbon of Darkness"—a number one hit on the U.S. country chart with Marty Robbins's cover in 1965—and "Black Day in July", about the 1967 Detroit riot, brought him wide recognition in the 1960s. Canadian chart success with his own recordings began in 1962 with the No. 3 hit  Me) I'm the One", followed by recognition and charting abroad in the 1970s. He topped the US Hot 100 or AC chart with the hits "If You Could Read My Mind" (1970), "Sundown" (1974); "Carefree Highway" (1974), "Rainy Day People" (1975), and "The Wreck of the Edmund Fitzgerald" (1976), and had many other hits that appeared in the top 40.

Several of Lightfoot's albums achieved gold and multi-platinum status internationally. His songs have been recorded by artists such as Elvis Presley, Johnny Cash, Hank Williams Jr., The Kingston Trio, Jerry Lee Lewis, Neil Young, Bob Dylan, Judy Collins, Barbra Streisand, Johnny Mathis, Herb Alpert, Harry Belafonte, Sarah McLachlan, Eric Clapton, John Mellencamp, Peter, Paul and Mary, Ian & Sylvia, Glen Campbell, Tony Rice, The Grateful Dead, Nico, Olivia Newton-John, Gene Clark, Dan Fogelberg, Jimmy Buffett, and Jim Croce. The Guess Who recorded a song called "Lightfoot" on their 1968 album Wheatfield Soul; the lyrics contain many Lightfoot song titles.

Robbie Robertson of the Band described Lightfoot as "a national treasure". Bob Dylan, also a Lightfoot fan, called him one of his favorite songwriters and said,  "I can't think of any Gordon Lightfoot song I don't like. Everytime I hear a song of his, it's like I wish it would last forever.... Lightfoot became a mentor for a long time. I think he probably still is to this day". Lightfoot was a featured musical performer at the opening ceremonies of the 1988 Winter Olympic Games in Calgary, Alberta. He received an honorary Doctor of Laws degree from Trent University in Spring 1979 and was made a Companion of the Order of Canada in May 2003. In November 1997, the Governor General's Performing Arts Award, Canada's highest honour in the performing arts, was bestowed on Lightfoot. On February 6, 2012, Lightfoot was presented with the Queen Elizabeth II Diamond Jubilee Medal by the Lieutenant Governor of Ontario. June of that year saw his induction into the Songwriters Hall of Fame. On June 6, 2015, Lightfoot received an honorary doctorate of music in his hometown of Orillia from Lakehead University.

Early life, family and education
Lightfoot was born in Orillia, Ontario, to Jessie Vick Trill Lightfoot and Gordon Lightfoot Sr., who owned a local dry cleaning business. He is of Scottish descent. He had an older sister, Beverley (1935–2017). His mother recognized Lightfoot's musical talent early on and schooled him to become a successful child performer. He first performed publicly in grade four, singing the Irish lullaby "Too Ra Loo Ra Loo Ral", which was broadcast over his school's public address system during a parents' day event. 

As a youth, he sang in the choir of Orillia's St. Paul's United Church under the direction of choirmaster Ray Williams. According to Lightfoot, Williams taught him how to sing with emotion and how to have confidence in his voice. Lightfoot was a boy soprano; he appeared periodically on local Orillia radio, performed in local operettas and oratorios, and gained exposure through various Kiwanis music festivals. At the age of twelve, after winning a competition for boys whose voices had not yet changed, he made his first appearance at Massey Hall in Toronto. 

As a teenager, Lightfoot learned piano and taught himself to play drums and percussion. He held concerts in Muskoka, a resort area north of Orillia, singing "for a couple of beers".

Lightfoot performed extensively throughout high school, Orillia District Collegiate & Vocational Institute (ODCVI), and taught himself to play folk guitar. A formative influence on his music at this time was 19th-century master American songwriter Stephen Foster. He was also an accomplished high school track-and-field competitor and set school records for shot-put and pole vault, as well as playing the starting nose tackle on his school's Georgian Bay championship-winning football team. His athletic and scholarly aptitude earned him scholarships at McGill University's Schulich School of Music and the University of Toronto, Faculty of Music.

Lightfoot moved to California in 1958 to study jazz composition and orchestration for two years at Hollywood's Westlake College of Music, which had many Canadian students.

Career beginnings
To support himself while there, he sang on demonstration records and wrote, arranged, and produced commercial jingles. Among his influences were the folk music of Pete Seeger, Bob Gibson, Ian and Sylvia Tyson, and The Weavers. He lived in Los Angeles for a time, but he missed Toronto and returned there in 1960, living in Canada since, though he has done much work in the United States, under an H-1B visa.

After his return to Canada, Lightfoot performed with The Singin’ Swingin’ Eight, a group featured on CBC TV's Country Hoedown, and with the Gino Silvi Singers. He soon became known at Toronto folk music oriented coffee houses. In 1962, Lightfoot released two singles, both recorded at RCA in Nashville and produced by Chet Atkins, that were local hits in Toronto and received some airplay elsewhere in Canada.  Me) I'm the One" reached No. 3 on CHUM radio in Toronto in July 1962 and was a top 20 hit on Montreal's CKGM, then a very influential Canadian Top 40 radio station. The follow-up single was "Negotiations"/"It's Too Late, He Wins"; it reached No. 27 on CHUM in December. He sang with Terry Whelan in a duo called the "Two-Tones". They recorded a live album that was released in 1962 called Two-Tones at the Village Corner (1962, Chateau CLP-1012).

In 1963, Lightfoot travelled in Europe and in the UK, and for one year he hosted BBC TV's Country and Western Show, returning to Canada in 1964. He appeared at the Mariposa Folk Festival and began to develop a reputation as a songwriter. Ian and Sylvia Tyson recorded "Early Mornin' Rain" and "For Lovin' Me"; a year later both songs were recorded by Peter, Paul and Mary; other performers who recorded one or both of these songs included Elvis Presley, Bob Dylan, Chad & Jeremy, George Hamilton IV, The Clancy Brothers, and the Johnny Mann Singers. Established recording artists such as Marty Robbins ("Ribbon of Darkness"), Leroy Van Dyke ("I'm Not Saying"), Judy Collins ("Early Morning Rain"), Richie Havens and Spyder Turner ("I Can't Make It Anymore"), and The Kingston Trio ("Early Morning Rain") all achieved chart success with Gordon Lightfoot's material.

United Artists years

In 1965, Lightfoot signed a management contract with Albert Grossman, who also represented many prominent American folk performers, and signed a recording contract with United Artists who released his version of "I'm Not Sayin'" as a single. Appearances at the Newport Folk Festival, The Tonight Show Starring Johnny Carson, and New York's Town Hall increased his following and bolstered his reputation. 1966 marked the release of his debut album Lightfoot!, which brought him greater exposure as both a singer and a songwriter. The album featured many now-famous songs, including "For Lovin' Me", "Early Mornin' Rain", "Steel Rail Blues", and "Ribbon of Darkness". On the strength of the Lightfoot! album, which blended Canadian and universal themes, Lightfoot became one of the first Canadian singers to achieve definitive home-grown stardom without having moved permanently to the United States to develop it.

To kick off Canada's Centennial year, the CBC commissioned Lightfoot to write the "Canadian Railroad Trilogy" for a special broadcast on January 1, 1967.  Between 1966 and 1969, Lightfoot recorded four additional albums for United Artists: The Way I Feel (1967), Did She Mention My Name? (1968), Back Here on Earth (1968), and the live recording Sunday Concert (1969), and consistently placed singles in the Canadian top 40, including "Go-Go Round", "Spin, Spin", and "The Way I Feel". His biggest hit of the era was a rendition of Bob Dylan's "Just Like Tom Thumb's Blues", which peaked at No. 3 on the Canadian charts in December 1965. Did She Mention My Name?, released in January 1968, featured "Black Day in July", about the 1967 Detroit riot. Weeks later, upon the assassination of Martin Luther King Jr. on April 4, radio stations in 30 states pulled the song for "fanning the flames", even though the song was a plea for racial harmony.  Lightfoot stated at the time radio station owners cared more about playing songs "that make people happy" and not those "that make people think."  Unhappy at a lack of support from United Artists, he defected to Warner Bros. Records, scoring his first major international hit in early 1971 with "If You Could Read My Mind".

Lightfoot's albums from this time were well received abroad but did not produce any hit singles. Outside of Canada, he remained better known as a songwriter than as a performer.

His success as a live performer continued to grow throughout the late 1960s. He embarked on his first Canadian national tour in 1967, and also performed in New York City. Between 1967 and 1974, Lightfoot toured Europe and was well-received on two tours of Australia.

UA continued to release "Best of" album compilations in the 1970s even after Lightfoot became a subsequent success at Warner Bros./Reprise.

Warner Bros./Reprise years
Lightfoot signed to Warner Bros./Reprise in 1970 and scored a major hit in the United States with "If You Could Read My Mind", which sold over one million copies by early 1971 and was awarded a gold disc. The song had originally appeared on the poorly-selling 1970 album Sit Down Young Stranger. After the song's success, the album was reissued under the new title If You Could Read My Mind; it reached No. 5 nationally and represented a major turning point in Lightfoot's career. The album also featured a second recorded version of "Me and Bobby McGee", as well as "The Pony Man", "Your Love's Return (Song for Stephen Foster)", and "Minstrel of the Dawn".

Over the next seven years, he recorded a series of successful albums that established him as a singer-songwriter:
 Summer Side of Life (1971), with songs "Ten Degrees and Getting Colder", "Miguel", "Cabaret", "Nous Vivons Ensemble", and the title track
 Don Quixote (1972), with "Beautiful", "Looking at the Rain", "Christian Island (Georgian Bay)", and the title track, which is a concert favorite
 Old Dan's Records (1972), with the title track, the two-sided single "That Same Old Obsession"/"You Are What I Am", and the songs "It's Worth Believin'" and "Can't Depend on Love"
 Sundown (1974). Besides the title track, it includes "Carefree Highway", "Seven Island Suite", "The Watchman's Gone", "High and Dry", "Circle of Steel", and "Too Late for Prayin'"
 Cold on the Shoulder (1975). Along with title track are songs "Bend in the Water", "The Soul Is the Rock", "Rainbow Trout", "All the Lovely Ladies" and the hit "Rainy Day People"
 A double compilation LP Gord's Gold (in 1975) containing nine new versions of his most popular songs from the United Artists era
 Summertime Dream (1976), along with "The Wreck of the Edmund Fitzgerald" are the songs "I'm Not Supposed to Care", "Race Among the Ruins", "Spanish Moss", "Never Too Close", and the title track
 Endless Wire (1978) with "Daylight Katy", "If Children Had Wings", "Sweet Guinevere", a new version of "The Circle Is Small" from Back Here on Earth, and the title track

During the 1970s, Lightfoot's songs covered a wide range of subjects, including "Don Quixote", about Cervantes' famous literary character, "Ode to Big Blue", about the widespread killing of whales, "Beautiful", about the simple joys of love, "Carefree Highway", about the freedom of the open road, "Protocol", about the futility of war, and "Alberta Bound", which was inspired by a lonely teenaged girl named Grace he met on a bus while travelling to Calgary in 1971.

In 1972, Lightfoot contracted Bell's palsy, a condition that left his face partially paralyzed for a time. The affliction curtailed his touring schedule but Lightfoot nevertheless continued to deliver major hits: in June 1974 his classic single "Sundown" from the album Sundown went to No.1 on the American and Canadian charts. It would be his only number one hit in the United States. He performed it twice on NBC's The Midnight Special series. "Carefree Highway" (about Arizona State Route 74 in Phoenix, Arizona) was the follow-up single from the same album. It charted in the Top 10 in both countries. Lightfoot wrote it after traveling from Flagstaff, Arizona on Interstate 17 to Phoenix.

The lyrics in his song, "The Wreck of the Edmund Fitzgerald", released the following year, were substantially based on facts in the article. It reached number two on the United States Billboard chart and was a number one hit in Canada. Lightfoot appeared at several 25th anniversary memorial services of the sinking, and continues personal contact with the family members of the men who perished in the Edmund Fitzgerald.

"Sundown" and "The Wreck of the Edmund Fitzgerald" continue to receive heavy airplay on many classic rock stations. In 1978, Lightfoot had another top 40 hit on the United States Hot 100, a re-recorded version of "The Circle Is Small (I Can See It in Your Eyes)," which reached number 33.

During the 1980s and the 1990s, Lightfoot recorded six more original albums and a compilation for Warner Bros./Reprise: Dream Street Rose (1980), Shadows (1982), Salute (1983), East of Midnight (1986), another compilation Gord's Gold, Vol. 2 (1988), Waiting for You (1993), and A Painter Passing Through (1998).

The album Dream Street Rose has the folk-pop sound that Lightfoot established during the previous decade. In addition to the title song, it includes songs such as "Ghosts of Cape Horn" and "On the High Seas". It also includes the Leroy Van Dyke 1950s composition "The Auctioneer", a bluegrass-like number that was a concert staple for Lightfoot from the mid-1960s to the 1980s.

The album Shadows represents a departure from the acoustic sound of the 1970s and introduces an adult-contemporary sound. Songs like "Shadows" and "Thank You for the Promises" contain an underlying sadness and resignation. The 1982 American released single "Baby Step Back" marked his last time in the top 50 in that country.
The 1983 album Salute produced no hit singles; the 1986 East of Midnight album had several Adult Contemporary songs like "A Passing Ship", "Morning Glory", and "I'll Tag Along" (East of Midnight). A single from East of Midnight, "Anything for Love", made the Billboard Country & Western chart.

In April 1987, Lightfoot filed a lawsuit against composer Michael Masser, claiming that Masser's melody for the song "The Greatest Love of All", versions of which were recorded and released by George Benson in 1977 and Whitney Houston in 1985, had stolen 24 bars from Lightfoot's 1971 hit song "If You Could Read My Mind". The transitional section that begins "I decided long ago never to walk in anyone's shadow" of the Masser song has the same melody as "I never thought I could feel this way and I got to say that I just don't get it; I don't know where we went wrong but the feeling's gone and I just can't get it back" of Lightfoot's song. Lightfoot later stated that he did not want people thinking that he had stolen his melody from Masser. The case was settled out of court and Masser issued a public apology.

Lightfoot rounded out the decade with his follow-up compilation Gord's Gold, Vol. 2, in late 1988, which contained re-recorded versions of his most popular songs, including a re-make of the 1970 song "The Pony Man". The original had been brisk in pace, acoustic, and about three minutes long. This new version was slower, clocking in at four minutes plus.

Lightfoot performed with noted Canadian artist Ian Tyson at the opening ceremonies of the 1988 winter Olympics in Calgary.
 
During the 1990s, Lightfoot returned to his acoustic roots and recorded two albums. Waiting for You (1993) includes songs such as "Restless", "Wild Strawberries", and Bob Dylan's "Ring Them Bells".  1998's A Painter Passing Through reintroduced a sound more reminiscent of his early recordings, with songs like "Much to My Surprise", "Red Velvet", "Drifters", and "I Used to Be a Country Singer". Throughout the decade, Lightfoot played about 50 concerts a year. In 1999 Rhino Records released Songbook, a four-CD boxed set of Lightfoot recordings with rare and unreleased tracks from the 1960s, 1970s, 1980s, and 1990s plus a small hardback booklet for his fans that described how he created his songs and gave facts about his career.

In April 2000, Lightfoot taped a live concert in Reno, Nevada; this one-hour show was broadcast by CBC in October, and as a PBS special across the United States. PBS stations offered a videotape of the concert as a pledge gift, and a tape and DVD were released in 2001 in Europe and North America. This was the first Lightfoot concert video released. In April 2001, Lightfoot performed at the Tin Pan South Legends concert at Ryman Auditorium in Nashville, closing the show.  In May, he performed "Ring Them Bells" at Massey Hall in honour of Bob Dylan's 60th birthday.

Illness and return to performing
By January 2002, Lightfoot had written 30 new songs for his next studio album. He recorded guitar and vocal demos of some of these new songs. In September, before the second concert of a two-night stand in Orillia, Lightfoot suffered severe stomach pain and was airlifted to McMaster Medical Centre in Hamilton, Ontario. He underwent emergency vascular surgery for a ruptured abdominal aortic aneurysm, and he remained in serious condition in the Intensive Care Unit (ICU). Lightfoot endured a six-week coma and a tracheotomy, and he underwent four surgical operations. All of his remaining 2002 concert dates were cancelled. More than three months after being taken to the McMaster Medical Centre, Lightfoot was released in December to continue his recovery at home.

In 2003, Lightfoot underwent follow-up surgery to continue the treatment of his abdominal condition. In November he signed a new recording contract with Linus Entertainment and began rehearsing with his band for the first time since his illness.  Also in 2003, Borealis Records, a related label to Linus Entertainment, released Beautiful: A Tribute to Gordon Lightfoot.  On this album, various artists, including The Cowboy Junkies, Bruce Cockburn, Jesse Winchester, Maria Muldaur, and The Tragically Hip interpreted Lightfoot's songs. The final track on the album, "Lightfoot", was the only song not previously released by Lightfoot. It was composed and performed by Aengus Finnan.

In January 2004, Lightfoot completed work on his album Harmony, which he had mostly recorded prior to his illness. The album was released on his new home label of Linus Records on May 11 of that year.  It was his 20th original album and included a single and new video for "Inspiration Lady". Other songs were "Clouds of Loneliness", "Sometimes I Wish", "Flyin' Blind", and "No Mistake About It". The album contained the upbeat yet reflective track called "End of All Time"

In July 2004, he made a surprise comeback performance, his first since falling ill, at Mariposa in Orillia, performing "I'll Tag Along" solo. In August he performed a five-song solo set in Peterborough, Ontario, at a flood relief benefit. In November he made his long-awaited return to the concert stage with two sold-out benefit shows in Hamilton, Ontario.

Lightfoot returned to the music business with his new album selling well and an appearance on Canadian Idol, where the six top contestants each performed a song of his, culminating in a group performance – on their own instruments – of his Canadian Railroad Trilogy. In 2005, he made a low-key tour called the Better Late Than Never Tour.

On September 14, 2006, while in the middle of a performance, Lightfoot suffered a minor stroke that eventually left him without the use of the middle and ring fingers on his right hand. He returned to performing nine days later and for a brief time used a substitute guitarist for more difficult guitar work. Full recovery took longer, "I fought my way back in seven or eight months". In 2007, Lightfoot had full use of his right hand and played all of the guitar parts in concert as he originally wrote them. He continues to perform.

While a tour was being planned for 2008, Lightfoot's manager, Barry Harvey, died at age 56 on December 4, 2007. In late 2009, Lightfoot undertook a 26-city tour.

In February 2010, Gordon Lightfoot was the victim of a death hoax originating from Twitter, when then-CTV journalist David Akin posted on Twitter and Facebook that Lightfoot had died. Lightfoot was at a dental appointment at the time the rumors spread and found out when listening to the radio on his drive home. Lightfoot dispelled those rumors by phoning Charles Adler of CJOB, the DJ and radio station he heard reporting his demise, and did an interview expressing that he was alive and well. In 2012, Lightfoot continued to tour, telling a sold-out crowd June 15 at Ottawa's National Arts Centre that he still performs sixty times a year. Lightfoot played two shows at the NAC after his induction into the Songwriters Hall of Fame.

Lightfoot performed at the 100th Grey Cup in November 2012, performing "Canadian Railroad Trilogy", and was extremely well received.

Lightfoot's first tour of the United Kingdom in 35 years was announced in 2015, with 11 dates across England, Ireland and Scotland between May 18, 2016, and June 1, 2016. According to his website, 2017 tour dates include the United States and Canada.

Lightfoot played at Canada's 150th birthday celebration on Parliament Hill, July 1, 2017, introduced by Prime Minister Justin Trudeau. The Prime Minister mentioned that Mr. Lightfoot had played the same stage exactly 50 years earlier, during Canada's 100th birthday.

In a 2016 interview with The Canadian Press Lightfoot said: "At this age, my challenge is doing the best show I can ... I'm very much improved from where I was and the seriousness with which I take it."

Lightfoot said in 2016 that he was not planning to return to songwriting later in life as he had concluded it was "such an isolating thing" for him earlier in his career, affecting his family life. However, that changed in 2019 when he announced plans for a new studio album for the first time in nearly two decades.

His 2017 and 2018 tours included dozens of dates in Canada and the US.
Lightfoot's 2019 tour was interrupted when he was injured while working out in a gym.  In March 2020 his concert schedule was interrupted by governmental restrictions during the coronavirus pandemic.

On March 20, 2020, Lightfoot released Solo without the accompaniment of other musicians. It was his 21st studio album, released more than 54 years after his debut album.  It was released by Warner Music Canada, marking Lightfoot's return to Warner Music Group.

Sound
Lightfoot's sound, both in the studio and on tour, is centred on Lightfoot's baritone voice and folk-based twelve-string acoustic guitar. From 1965 to 1970, lead guitarist Red Shea was an important supporting player, with bassists Paul Wideman and John Stockfish filling out the arrangements.

In 1968 bassist Rick Haynes joined the band, and lead guitarist Terry Clements joined the following year. Shea left the touring band in 1970, but continued to record with Lightfoot until 1975. He hosted his own Canadian variety show, played with Ian Tyson, and became band leader for Tommy Hunter's TV show in the 1980s on CBC. Shea played on most of Lightfoot's early hits.  Haynes and Clements remained with Lightfoot and composed the core of his band.

In 1975, Pee Wee Charles added pedal steel guitar to Lightfoot's songs. Drummer Barry Keane joined the following year and in 1981, keyboardist Mike Heffernan completed the ensemble. This five-piece backup band remained intact until 1987, when Charles left the band to operate a radio station in Southern Ontario.

Three members of Lightfoot's band have died over the years: Red Shea in June 2008 from pancreatic cancer, Clements at 63 on February 20, 2011, following a stroke and original bassist John Stockfish from natural causes on August 20, 2012, at 69.

Haynes, Keane and Heffernan continue to tour and record with Lightfoot, having added in 2011 guitarist Carter Lancaster from Hamilton, Ontario, a "great player", according to Lightfoot.

Personal life
Lightfoot has been married three times. His first marriage in April 1963 was to a Swedish woman, Brita Ingegerd Olaisson, with whom he had two children, Fred and Ingrid. They divorced in 1973, the marriage ending in part because of his infidelity. Lightfoot has acknowledged that his musical touring and the fact that he found fidelity difficult in a long-distance relationship contributed to the failure of at least two relationships.

The song "If You Could Read My Mind" was written in reflection upon his disintegrating marriage. At the request of his daughter, Ingrid, he performs the lyrics with a slight change now: the line "I'm just trying to understand the feelings that you lack" is altered to "I'm just trying to understand the feelings that we lack." He has said in an interview that the difficulty with writing songs inspired by personal stories is that there is not always the emotional distance and clarity to make lyrical improvements such as the one his daughter suggested.

Lightfoot was unmarried for 16 years. He has two other children from relationships between his first and second marriages:  Gaylen McGee and Eric Lightfoot.

In the early 1970s, Lightfoot was involved with Cathy Smith; their volatile relationship inspired his songs "Sundown" and "Rainy Day People," among others. "Cathy was a great lady," Mr. Lightfoot told The Globe and Mail after her death. "Men were drawn to her, and she used to make me jealous. But I don’t have a bad thing to say about her." Smith later became notorious as the person who injected John Belushi with a fatal speedball.

In 1989, he married Elizabeth Moon. They had two children: Miles and Meredith. They divorced in 2011 after a separation that Lightfoot said had lasted nine years.

Lightfoot wed for a third time on December 19, 2014, at Rosedale United Church to Kim Hasse.

To stay in shape to meet the demands of touring and public performing, Lightfoot works out in a gym six days per week, but declared in 2012 that he was "fully prepared to go whenever I'm taken." He calmly stated, "I've been almost dead a couple times, once almost for real ... I have more incentive to continue now because I feel I'm on borrowed time, in terms of age."

Lightfoot's band members have displayed loyalty to him, as both musicians and friends, recording and performing with him for as many as 45 years.

Honours and awards

As an individual, apart from various awards associated with his albums and singles, Gordon Lightfoot has received sixteen Juno Awards—for top folk singer in 1965, 1966, 1968, 1969, 1973, 1974, 1975, 1976 and 1977, for top male vocalist in 1967, 1970, 1971, 1972 and 1973, and as composer of the year in 1972 and 1976. He has received ASCAP awards for songwriting in 1971, 1974, 1976, and 1977, and has been nominated for five Grammy Awards. In 1974 Lightfoot's song "Sundown" was named pop record of the year by the Music Operators of America. In 1980 he was named Canadian male recording artist of the decade, for his work in the 1970s.

Lightfoot was chosen as the celebrity captain of the Toronto Maple Leafs for the NHL's 75th anniversary season in 1991–1992.

Lightfoot was inducted into the Canadian Music Hall of Fame in 1986 and the Canadian Country Music Hall of Fame in 2001. He was inducted into Canada's Walk of Fame in 1998. In May 2003 he was made a Companion of the Order of Canada, the country's highest civilian honour.  Lightfoot is a member of the Order of Ontario, the highest honour in the province of Ontario. In 1977, he received the Vanier Award from the Canadian Jaycees. In 2007 Canada Post honoured Lightfoot and three other Canadian music artists (Anne Murray, Paul Anka, and Joni Mitchell) with postage stamps highlighting their names and images. On June 24, 2012, Lightfoot was inducted into the Songwriters Hall of Fame in a New York City ceremony, along with Bob Seger.

Between 1986 and 1988, Lightfoot's friend Ken Danby (1940–2007), the realist painter, worked on a large (60 × 48 inches) portrait of Lightfoot dressed in the white suit he wore on the cover of the album East of Midnight. The picture was backlit by the sun, creating a visually iconic image of the singer.

On June 16, 2014, Lightfoot was awarded the prestigious Lifetime Achievement Award by SOCAN at the 2014 SOCAN Awards in Toronto.

On October 23, 2015, Lightfoot was honoured with a 4-metre tall bronze sculpture in his hometown of Orillia, Ontario. The sculpture, called Golden Leaves—A Tribute to Gordon Lightfoot, features Lightfoot sitting cross-legged, playing an acoustic guitar underneath an arch of golden maple leaves. Many of the leaves depict scenes from Lightfoot's 1975 greatest hits album, Gord's Gold.

In 2017, Lightfoot rated fifth in the CBC's list of the 25 best Canadian songwriters ever, and was awarded the Gold Medal of the Royal Canadian Geographical Society.

He is the subject the 2019 documentary Gordon Lightfoot: If You Could Read My Mind.

In 2022, Lightfoot received the Golden Plate Award of the American Academy of Achievement.

Discography

 Lightfoot! (1966)
 The Way I Feel (1967)
 Did She Mention My Name? (1968)
 Back Here on Earth (1968)
 Sit Down Young Stranger (aka If You Could Read My Mind) (1970)
 Summer Side of Life (1971)
 Don Quixote (1972)
 Old Dan's Records (1972)
 Sundown (1974)
 Cold on the Shoulder (1975)
 Summertime Dream (1976)
 Endless Wire (1978)
 Dream Street Rose (1980)
 Shadows (1982)
 Salute (1983)
 East of Midnight (1986)
 Waiting for You (1993)
 A Painter Passing Through (1998)
 Harmony (2004)
 Solo (2020)
 Beginnings  (2021)

See also

Canadian rock
Music of Canada

References

External links

 Order of Canada Citation
 page at Canadian Encyclopedia
 page at canadianbands.com
 
 CBC Digital Archives: Gordon Lightfoot: Canada's Folk Laureate
 
 Gordon Lightfoot - Canadian Communications Foundation 
Interview with Gordon Lightfoot in International Songwriters Association's "Songwriter Magazine"

1938 births
Living people
People from Orillia
Musicians from Ontario
Writers from Ontario
Canadian Music Hall of Fame inductees
Canadian baritones
Canadian country singer-songwriters
Canadian folk singer-songwriters
Canadian pop singers
Canadian people of Scottish descent
Canadian male singer-songwriters
Companions of the Order of Canada
Juno Award for Songwriter of the Year winners
Members of the Order of Ontario
Members of the United Church of Canada
United Artists Records artists
Canadian folk rock musicians
Canadian folk guitarists
Canadian male guitarists
Fingerstyle guitarists
Governor General's Performing Arts Award winners
True North Records artists
Warner Records artists
Acoustic guitarists
Reprise Records artists
Juno Award for Artist of the Year winners
Canadian Folk Music Award winners